Pressing On may refer to:
 "Pressing On" (Relient K song)
 "Pressing On" (Bob Dylan song)